Padawan Municipal Council (Malay: Majlis Perbandaran Padawan) (MPP or PMC) is a local authority which administers Padawan municipality of the Kuching District, Sarawak, Malaysia. The agency is under the purview of Sarawak Ministry of Local Government and Community Development. MPP headquarters is located at Kota Padawan, at 10th mile (16 km) away from Kuching city centre. The council aimed to improve infrastructure development and provide quality services to its residents besides preserving the environment.

History

Kuching Rural District Council (KRDC)
Kuching Rural District Council (KRDC) was formed in 1956 during the colonial era. From 1957 to 1961, the district officer would become the chairman of the council. From 1962 to 1981, elections would be held for a new chairman. However, starting from 1 November 1981, new chairman would be appointed by the Sarawak state government.

Padawan Municipal Council (PMC)
On 1 August 1996, KRDC was elevated to Padawan Municipal Council, 40 years after the formation of KRDC. Municipal secretary would be chief executive officer and warrant holder of the council.

Administration
The main source of revenue for the council is the assessment tax (a local property tax that based on the annual rental value of the property). A total of RM 15 million assessment tax has been collected as on 1 January 2006.

Committees
The council has six standing committees namely:
 Finance and Establishment Standing Committee
 General Purposes and Community Services Standing Committee
 Public Health, Environmental Protection and Council Services Standing Committee
 Market, Licensing, Hawkers and Petty Traders Standing Committee
 Traffic, Infrastructure Development, Building Plans and Town Planning Standing Committee
 Landscape and Tourism Standing Committee

See also 
Kuching North City Hall (DBKU)
Kuching South City Council (MBKS)

References

Kuching
Local government in Sarawak
Municipal councils in Malaysia